Bullington may refer to:

Bullington, Hampshire
Bullington, Lincolnshire
Bullington, Ontario

People
Bryan Bullington (born 1980), American baseball pitcher
James R. Bullington (born 1940), American ambassador
Jesse Bullington, American fantasy writer
Kenneth Bullington (1913-1984), American electrical engineer
Orville Bullington (1882-1956), American lawyer, businessman and politician
Wally Bullington, American football player